Bynt or Bint is a surname. Notable people with the surname include:

Robert Bynt (died before 1431), English lawmaker
Robertus le Bynt, 14th century English lawmaker

See also
Bint, Iran
Patronymic#Arabic bint